The Handyman is a 1980 Canadian drama/romance film directed by Micheline Lanctôt.

Plot 
The film centres on Armand Dorion (Jocelyn Bérubé), a shy, self-conscious man who works as a handyman; after he is hired to do some work for Thérèse St-Amant (Andrée Pelletier), a married woman who turns out to be as shy and self-conscious as him, the two begin a love affair.

The cast also includes Marcel Sabourin as Georges, Armand's gay roommate who works as a limousine driver and has unrequited feelings of his own for Armand.

Reception 
The film earned six Genie Award nominations at the 2nd Genie Awards in 1981.

References

External links 
 
 

1980 films
Canadian romantic drama films
Films set in Montreal
Films shot in Montreal
1980 romantic drama films
Films directed by Micheline Lanctôt
Canadian LGBT-related films
1980 LGBT-related films
LGBT-related romantic drama films
1980s French-language films
French-language Canadian films
1980s Canadian films